Artem Vasilevich Padun (born 2 August 1983 in Chernihiv) is a Ukrainian professional footballer who plays as a goalkeeper for Chernihiv.

Player career
He started his career in 2000 with Desna Chernihiv. Between 2007 and 2008, he played nine matches for Arsenal-Kyivshchyna Bila Tserkva, and in summer 2009, moved back to Desna Chernihiv. Two years later, he moved to Avangard Korukivka, where he played 64 matches and won the Chernihiv Oblast Football Championship twice and the Chernihiv Oblast Football Cup once. In summer 2021, he moved to rival club FC Chernihiv in the Ukrainian Second League.

Coach career
In 2015, he was appointed as coach of Avanhard Koryukivka before moving on to SDYuShOR Desna later in the year. In 2020 he become the goalkeeping coach of FC Chernihiv.

Philanthropy
In 12 March 2022, together with Valentyn Krukovets, Volodymyr Chulanov, Oleksandr Babor, he organized a charity tournament at Chernihiv Stadium to raise money to reconstruct the house of Volodymyr Matsuta which was destroyed by Russian troops during the Siege of Chernihiv.

Career statistics

Club

Honours
FC Avanhard Kriukivka
 Chernihiv Oblast Football Championship: 2012, 2013
 Chernihiv Oblast Football Cup 2013

Arsenal-Kyivshchyna Bila Tserkva
 Ukrainian Second League: 2008–09

References

External links
 
 
 
 
 Facebook.com
 
 Ok.ru

1983 births
Living people
Footballers from Chernihiv
FC Desna Chernihiv players
FC Chernihiv players
FC Arsenal-Kyivshchyna Bila Tserkva players
FC Avanhard Koriukivka players
SDYuShOR Desna players
SDYuShOR Desna managers
Ukrainian footballers
Association football goalkeepers
Ukrainian Second League players
Ukrainian First League players
Ukrainian Amateur Football Championship players